Antioch is an unincorporated community in Pike Township, Jay County, Indiana.

History
Antioch was founded in 1853. It was named after Antioch College.

Geography

References

Unincorporated communities in Jay County, Indiana
Unincorporated communities in Indiana